Anastasios "Tasos" Karakoutsis (born 29 October 1983) is a Greek footballer who last played for AE Larissa in the Greek Football League as a goalkeeper.

Career
Karakoutsis comes from Krya Vrysi, Pella, and has previously played in Paniliakos, Polykastro, Pierikos and Niki Volou.

External links
 Myplayer Profile
 Sport Larissa
 Aelole
 Interview-Gazzetta

1983 births
Living people
Greek footballers
Association football goalkeepers
Paniliakos F.C. players
Pierikos F.C. players
Niki Volos F.C. players
Athlitiki Enosi Larissa F.C. players
Footballers from Giannitsa